The Heinkel HE 12 was a pontoon-equipped mail plane built in Germany in 1929, designed to be launched by catapult from a liner at sea.

Development
The concept was hit upon after Norddeutscher Lloyd (NDL) had carried a Junkers F.13 seaplane aboard the  during 1927 to provide joyrides for passengers when the liner was in port. NDL officials realised that a seaplane based on a liner could have a more practical commercial application, taking off with the liner's airmail while still a long distance from port, therefore drastically cutting down time taken for the mail to arrive. Since the crew of Lutzow had trouble providing the necessary maintenance for the F 13, Deutsche Luft Hansa agreed to provide the operational support for the venture, and when Bremen departed on her maiden voyage in 1929, a single HE 12 (D-1717) was carried aboard.

The HE 12 was a derivative of the military HE 9 design; a conventional, low-wing, strut-braced monoplane. The pilot and radio operator sat in tandem, open cockpits with the mail carried in a compartment behind them.

He 58 
A second aircraft, (D-1919, Atlantik), was built for flying from Europa, sister-ship of the Bremen. Designated He 58, the second aircraft was slightly larger overall, with increased payload and accommodation for the crew in a side-by-side open cockpit. Power was supplied by a  BMW Hornet A, initially un-cowled, but later fitted with a full long-chord cowling with cooling slits in the forward face.

Operational history
On 22 July, while still 400 km (250 mi) out of New York City, Bremen successfully launched the HE 12. When the seaplane was unloaded 2½ hours later, mail from Berlin had taken just 6½ days to reach New York. The next day, in front of a crowd of 3,500 people, mayor Jimmy Walker christened the HE 12 with the name of the city. On the return journey, the newly christened New York launched from  near Cherbourg on 1 August, landing in Bremerhaven four hours later, in time for the mail to be transferred to another aircraft and arrive in Berlin the same afternoon, 5½ days after leaving New York. Use of the seaplane saved around 20 hours on the westward trip, and 1–2 days on the eastward journey.

HE 12 (D-1717, New York) flew regularly from  until severely damaged in an accident at Cobequid Bay on 5 October 1931.

The He 58, (D-1919, Atlantik), continued in service on  until replaced by Junkers Ju 46 floatplanes.

Variants

Specifications (HE 12)

See also

References

Bibliography

External links

 "Shot From Ships" Air Classics, Mar 2002 by Cook, John C
 "New Catapult Drives Plane From Deck of Liner", November 1929, Popular Mechanics photo of Heinkel 12 on Bremen catapult
 "Catapult For Planes Is Engineering Wonder" Popular Mechanics, September 1930

1920s German mailplanes
Floatplanes
HE 012
Low-wing aircraft
Single-engined tractor aircraft
Aircraft first flown in 1929